Evelina Kos (born 21 October 1996) is a Slovenian footballer who plays as a defender for Mura and the Slovenia women's national team.

Honours

Club
Olimpija Ljubljana
 Slovenian Women's League: 2016–17, 2017–18
 Slovenian Cup: 2020–21, 2021–22

References

External links 
 

1996 births
Living people
People from Nova Gorica
Slovenian women's footballers
Women's association football defenders
Slovenia women's international footballers
ŽNK Mura players
ŽNK Olimpija Ljubljana players